The R-4090 Cyclone 22 was an experimental radial piston engine designed and built in prototype form in the United States during the 1940s.

Design and development
During the 1940s, Wright Aeronautical Corporation was constantly in competition with Pratt & Whitney for new engine designs required for civil and military aircraft. Utilising the Wright R-3350 Duplex-Cyclone as a basis, Wright developed a 22-cylinder engine, using R-3350 cylinders arranged as a two-row radial engine with 11 cylinders per row instead of 9.

Improved performance was expected from the R-4090 if there had been further development. A two-speed single-stage supercharger helped maintain rated power to higher altitudes.

The core of the engine was a forged steel crankcase which enclosed the three piece two-throw crankshaft. The cylinders were arranged equally around the crankcase, with each row off-set by 16.3636.° to ensure cooling airflow. Accessories similar to other Cyclone engines were arranged around the rear face of the crankcase and a 0.333:1 planetary reduction gearbox at the front.

Although there are no records of failings of the R-4090, the engine was abandoned to allow development of the R-3350 Duplex-Cyclone series.

Variants
XR-4090-1(790C22AA1), drove a single propeller.
R-4090-3(792C22AA), drove a contra-rotating propeller shaft and was intended to have a two-speed reduction gearbox to maximise efficiency in cruising flight.

Specifications (XR-4090-1)

See also

References

Bibliography
Gunston, Bill. World Encyclopedia of Aero Engines: From the Pioneers to the Present Day. 5th edition, Stroud, UK: Sutton, 2006.
White, Graham. Allied Aircraft Piston Engines of World War II: History and Development of Frontline Aircraft Piston Engines Produced by Great Britain and the United States During World War II. Warrendale, Pennsylvania: SAE International, 1995. 

1940s aircraft piston engines
Aircraft air-cooled radial piston engines
R-4090